Tamás Vaskó (born 20 February 1984) is a Hungarian footballer who plays for Csákvár.

Career
Vaskó started to play football in smaller clubs and joined Vasas in 1998. Three years later he started to play for Újpest FC, and he has been with the team ever since, except for a year he spent on loan with FC Tatabánya.

In 2006, despite his young age, he became the captain of Újpest FC.

Vaskó was on trial at Southampton F.C. during July 2007, but he failed to make sufficient impression and was not signed by the Championship club. Vaskó has now sealed a year-long loan deal with newly promoted League 1 runners up Bristol City. At the end of the loan deal Bristol City have the option of signing the defender on a 3-year contract. In the games he has played he has made an impression, scoring a goal against Burnley and defending well. However, he was sent back to Újpest FC after Bristol City did not wish to sign him permanently.
Now is a player of US Avellino Italy second division.
However, his spell at Bristol City seems to have made a lasting impression on the club's management, who have been rumoured to have made a bid to resign the Centre Half permanently. But instead he moved to Italian side Avellino. His loan spell ended after the 2009 season and he returned to Újpest FC.

Nickname
His nickname whilst at Újpest FC was 'The White Rhino' because of his immense size.

Club statistics

References

External links
Tamás Vaskó profile at bcfc.co.uk

1984 births
Footballers from Budapest
Living people
Hungarian footballers
Association football central defenders
Hungary international footballers
Újpest FC players
FC Tatabánya players
Bristol City F.C. players
U.S. Avellino 1912 players
Fehérvár FC players
Kecskeméti TE players
Mezőkövesdi SE footballers
Puskás Akadémia FC players
Dunaújváros PASE players
Békéscsaba 1912 Előre footballers
Vasas SC players
Egri FC players
Csákvári TK players
Nemzeti Bajnokság I players
English Football League players
Serie B players
Nemzeti Bajnokság II players
Hungarian expatriate footballers
Expatriate footballers in England
Expatriate footballers in Italy
Hungarian expatriate sportspeople in England
Hungarian expatriate sportspeople in Italy